All That Remains is an American metalcore band from Springfield, Massachusetts, formed in 1998. They have released nine studio albums, a live CD and DVD, and have sold over a million records worldwide. The group currently consists of vocalist Philip Labonte, rhythm guitarist Mike Martin, former Diecast drummer Jason Costa, and lead guitarist Jason Richardson, with Labonte being the last remaining original member. In spite of this, the band's line-up had remained consistent from the release of 2008's Overcome until 2015's The Order of Things, spanning four albums. This line-up changed, however, in September 2015, when long-time bassist Jeanne Sagan left the band, with Patrick taking her place, and then again in February 2019, when the band confirmed that Jason Richardson would be joining the band to replace the deceased lead guitarist and original member, Oli Herbert. In 2021, Aaron Patrick parted ways with All That Remains to focus on his other band, Bury Your Dead.

History

Formation and first releases (1998–2005)
Phil Labonte, the vocalist for All That Remains, was originally the vocalist for Shadows Fall and appeared on the cult classic album Somber Eyes to the Sky. After being asked to leave because of "musical differences", Phil focused entirely on All That Remains, a side project he had been working on prior to leaving. The band released their debut album, Behind Silence and Solitude, on March 26, 2002, through Prosthetic Records. The style of the album differs from their current melodic metalcore musical style they have had since 2006, and more prominently contains elements of melodic death metal. It was also the band's only release featuring the original members Chris Bartlett and Dan Egan.

Their second album, This Darkened Heart, was released on March 23, 2004, through Prosthetic Records. Produced by Killswitch Engage guitarist Adam Dutkiewicz, the album featured better production compared to its predecessor. The three singles that were released from the album are "This Darkened Heart", "Tattered on My Sleeve", and "The Deepest Gray". Music videos were created for all three. This Darkened Heart is the first album with current guitarist Mike Martin.

The Fall of Ideals, Overcome, and success (2006–2009)

Their third album, The Fall of Ideals, was released on July 11, 2006, through Prosthetic Records. Once again, the album was produced by Adam Dutkiewicz. The album is also considered to be the band's breakthrough release, as it entered the Billboard 200 charts at number 75, selling almost 13,000 copies in its first week. "This Calling" was released as the album's first single. Two music videos were created, with one incorporating footage from Saw III (as it was the lead song from the film's soundtrack). A music video was made for the album's second single "The Air That I Breathe". The band was also a part of Ozzfest 2006. The song "Six" is featured in Guitar Hero II as an unlockable song . On June 20, 2007, it was announced that The Fall of Ideals had surpassed 100,000 sales in the United States. A music video for the album's third single "Not Alone" was filmed on July 4 and was released on September 10, 2007. In 2007, they played at Wacken Open Air in Wacken, Germany, to great success. On November 30, 2007, All That Remains released a live CD/DVD album titled All That Remains Live.

In early 2008, they embarked on a headlining tour with support from Chimaira and Black Tide with Divine Heresy and Light This City splitting the tour's opening slot. Five Finger Death Punch was originally supposed to play but dropped off before the tour started due to vocal problems. Later that summer All That Remains appeared on the Midwestern leg of Van's Warped Tour 2008. The band visited Audiohammer Studios in May 2008 to record their fourth studio album, entitled Overcome, with producer Jason Suecof. The album was released on September 16, 2008, with critics giving it mixed reviews due to its more mainstream sound, many claiming that the band had focused on catchy melodies rather than technical heavy-metal riffs. The song "Chiron" was released as the first single from the album and a video was produced for it. Two singles from the album",Chiron" and "Two Weeks", were also released for Rock Band as downloadable content, along with "This Calling". The band released a video for "Two Weeks" in October. "Two Weeks" was also featured as a free playable download on the popular iPhone OS game Tap Tap Revenge 2. On June 10, All That Remains started touring on the Rockstar Mayhem Festival, playing the Jägermeister stage along with God Forbid and headliners Trivium.

In April 2009, Phil Labonte posted on his Twitter that he was recording something in the studio on that same day with (at least) Oli and Mike. This turned out to be the acoustic version of "Forever in Your Hands". In late June 2009, drummer Jason Costa broke his hand, so the band temporarily recruited drummer Tony Laureano (Dimmu Borgir, Nile) to honor their commitment to the 2009 Rockstar Energy Mayhem Festival.

For We Are Many (2010–2011)
All That Remains announced plans to start recording another album, which began in April 2010. The band later confirmed the album would be released later in the year with Adam Dutkiewicz as the chosen producer. The album was released on October 12, 2010. In late September 2010, All That Remains announced "The Napalm & Noise Tour", which took place from November 23, 2013, to December 21, 2013. They co-headlined it with The Devil Wears Prada, and were supported by Story of the Year and Haste the Day. In October, All That Remains released the music video for their single "Forever in Your Hands". Also released on this day was a free download of the Japanese bonus track "Frozen" from Overcome. In January 2011, All That Remains won top honors in the Hard Rock/Metal category in the 9th Annual Independent Music Awards for the album.

On June 8, 2010, All That Remains premiered the title track "For We Are Many" during a show in Burlington, Vermont, under the working title of "Dem Trims". From August 18 to September 6, a free download of the title track, "For We Are Many", was available on the band's website after subscribing to their mailing list. On October 6, 2010, All That Remains released a music video for the single "Hold On". "For We Are Many" debuted at number 10 on the Billboard 200, selling a little over 29,000 copies in its first week. All That Remains took part in the Share the Welt Fall tour with Hatebreed, Rains, and Five Finger Death Punch.

A War You Cannot Win (2012–2013)
On January 25, 2012, Phil Labonte stated that the band was working on new material. On June 21, they revealed that their upcoming sixth studio album is titled A War You Cannot Win. On August 13, 2012, Phil uploaded "Down Through the Ages" to YouTube. All That Remains released the album cover to the album August 23. On August 27, the first single "Stand Up" was released on the radio. On August 29, All That Remains released the official lyric video to "Stand Up". The band has also released a free track of "Down Through the Ages" on their website from the album A War You Cannot Win, which was released on November 6, 2012. On October 21, 2013, the band released a music video for the track "What If I Was Nothing".

The Order of Things (2014–2015)
 
In January 2014, the band reported through their official Facebook page that they had started writing their seventh studio album. On June 26, 2014, it was confirmed that the band was in pre-production on their new album with producer Josh Wilbur, who had previously worked with Lamb of God and Gojira. The follow-up to 2012's A War You Cannot Win was tentatively due before the end of the year. However, during an interview with Phil Labonte on the Jasta Show, Phil stated that the new forthcoming record would more than likely be released in January.

On November 14, 2014, Phil Labonte announced that he released a new song from the new album. The song ended up being entitled "No Knock", which was released officially in digital stores on November 24, 2014. On November 20, Phil Labonte announced via Facebook that the new album title is The Order of Things. The album was released on February 24, 2015, via Razor & Tie, after the first single from the album, "This Probably Won't End Well", was released on January 13, 2015.

On September 24, 2015, the band announced the departure of Jeanne Sagan and the introduction of her replacement on bass, Aaron Patrick, formerly of Bury Your Dead and Devildriver.

Madness (2016–2018)
On August 1, it was reported that All That Remains were recording their eighth album at a Los Angeles-area studio with producer Howard Benson. Frontman Phil Labonte stated about the follow-up to 2015's The Order of Things: "The disc we are working on right now is going to blow people's minds. It's gonna challenge you. There are songs like nothing we've ever done before." The new album, officially been titled Madness, was released on April 28, 2017. The band toured North America with Alter Bridge in support of the album in late 2017.

Victim of the New Disease and Oli Herbert's death (2018–present)

On September 14, 2018, the band released a new song titled "Fuck Love" from their upcoming studio album set for release in early 2019. On September 26, the band released an image of the cover art to their social media pages, revealing the title of the new record to be Victim of the New Disease. 
On September 27, 2018, the band announced a release date of November 9.

On October 17, 2018, the band revealed through their Facebook page that lead guitarist and founding member Oli Herbert had died at the age of 44. On Facebook, his wife claimed to have received the toxicology report, which indicated that the cause of his death was drowning after taking antidepressants and sleeping aids, neither of which were prescribed. However, it has been reported that police are looking into his death and that it was possibly the result of foul play. The Facebook post has since been deleted. The investigation is ongoing.

On November 9, 2018, Labonte revealed in an interview that Jason Richardson (formerly of Chelsea Grin and Born of Osiris) would be filling in as lead guitarist for their upcoming tours.

On February 5, 2019, the band confirmed that Richardson would be joining the band as an official member via their Facebook page.

On February 2, 2022, it was announced that former bassist Matt Deis had rejoined the band.

Musical style and influences

Musical style
All That Remains has been described as metalcore, melodic metalcore, melodic death metal,  hard rock, and heavy metal. The band's music mixes "crushing" riffs, dual guitar harmonies, double bass drum patterns, and breakdowns that are prevalent in the metalcore genre. Vocally, the band combines singing, screaming, and growls. Phil Labonte's lyrics focus on themes such as relationships, personal struggles, society, and hope.

All That Remains has been considered a notable act within the new wave of American heavy metal.

In response to the metalcore label, which the band has often been classified as, Phil Labonte said: 

However, the band's guitarist Mike Martin has rejected the metalcore label saying: 

In an interview with Crypticrock, Mike Martin stated about their musical style:

Influences
The band's influences include In Flames, Metallica, Megadeth, Slayer, Iron Maiden, Pantera, Soilwork, At The Gates, King Diamond, Killswitch Engage, Hatebreed, Cannibal Corpse, Carcass, Grave, Arch Enemy, Biohazard, Cave In, Coalesce, Agnostic Front, and Earth Crisis. Oli Herbert had stated his biggest influence on guitar was Andy LaRocque of King Diamond. Also, he mentioned he draws much influence from George Lynch, John Sykes, and Randy Rhoads. Mike Martin has mentioned on numerous occasions that one of his biggest influences is John Mayer.

Phil Labonte has mentioned his influences range from Cannibal Corpse, Carcass, Grave, Metallica, Iron Maiden, Pantera, and even many 1980s hair metal bands. In an interview, Phil said:  He mentioned via Twitter and Facebook that he is a huge fan of Bring Me the Horizon, and The Acacia Strain. He also is known for being a huge fan of non-metal acts such as Sarah McLachlan, Garth Brooks, Carrie Underwood, Taylor Swift, Carly Rae Jepsen, and Skrillex.

In an interview with Blabbermouth.net, Labonte stated:

Members

Current
 Philip Labonte – lead vocals (1998–present)
 Matt Deis – bass (2003–2005, 2022–present)
 Mike Martin – rhythm guitar (2004–present)
 Jason Costa – drums (2006–present)
 Jason Richardson – lead guitar (2018–present)

Former
 Dan Egan – bass (1998–2003)
 Chris Bartlett – rhythm guitar (1998–2004)
 Michael Bartlett – drums (1998–2006)
 Shannon Lucas – drums (2006)
 Jeanne Sagan – bass, backing vocals (2006–2015)
 Oli Herbert – lead guitar (1998–2018; died 2018)
 Aaron Patrick – bass, backing vocals (2015–2021)

Timeline

Discography

Studio albums
Behind Silence and Solitude (2002)
This Darkened Heart (2004)
The Fall of Ideals (2006)
Overcome (2008)
For We Are Many (2010)
A War You Cannot Win (2012)
The Order of Things (2015)
Madness (2017)
Victim of the New Disease (2018)

Awards and nominations

Boston Music Awards

|-
| 2007 || All That Remains || Outstanding Metal/Hardcore Band of the Year || 

Metal Hammer Golden Gods Awards

|-
| 2009 || All That Remains || Best Breakthrough Artist ||

References

External links

Metalcore musical groups from Massachusetts
Heavy metal musical groups from Massachusetts
American melodic death metal musical groups
Musical groups from Springfield, Massachusetts
1998 establishments in Massachusetts
Musical groups established in 1998
Razor & Tie artists
Independent Music Awards winners
Musical quintets
Articles which contain graphical timelines